Notog Station (NTG) is a small railway station located in Notog, Patikraja, Banyumas Regency, Central Java, Indonesia.

The station sits at an elevation of +25 m above sea level. The station is under the subdivision DAOP V Purwokerto of PT Kereta Api Indonesia (Persero).

History 
Notog Station was built in 1915 by Staatsspoorwegen and opened on 1 July 1916 under the Dutch East Indies.

Initially the station had only three tracks (two passing tracks), however a recent upgrade on the Prupuk–Kroya railway (which included double-track rails) means that the station had an extra track. Trains used to have to stop for other trains to pass, but with the opening of the double track rail in 2019, all trains are no longer required to stop in Notog Station.

Services 
As of 2020, there are no trains stopping in Notog Station.

References

External links 

Banyumas Regency
Railway stations in Central Java
Railway stations opened in 1916